The Communist Party of Belarus (CPB;) is a communist and Marxist–Leninist political party in Belarus. The party was created in 1996 and supports the government of president Alexander Lukashenko. The leader of the party is Aliaksiej Sokal. The party has had more seats in the National Assembly of Belarus than any other party since the 2000 Belarusian parliamentary election, the first national election it participated in. However, most seats in the Belarusian legislature are held by independent politicians.

Overview

The party suggested merging with the Party of Communists of Belarus (PKB) on July 15, 2006. While the Communist Party of Belarus is a pro-presidential party, the Party of Communists of Belarus was one of the major opposition parties in Belarus. According to Sergey Kalyakin, the chairman of the PKB, the so-called "re-unification" of the two parties was a plot designed to oust the opposition PKB.

The main foreign policy goal of strengthening the party proclaimed national security through the development of Belarus-Russia Union State and the phase reconstruction voluntarily renewed Union nations, strengthening its political and economic independence.

The KPB is part of the Union of Communist Parties - Communist Party of the Soviet Union (SKP - KPSS) and the International Meeting of Communist and Workers' Parties (IMCWP); it enjoys relations with other communist parties in post-Soviet states and throughout the world to a much greater extent than the PKB, which is affiliated with the Party of the European Left and is considered by many in the region to be "pro-Western."

At the 2004 parliamentary election, the KPB obtained 5.99% and 8 out of 110 seats in the House of Representatives, 6 seats in 2008 and even less in 2012 - where it won 3 seats.

Because of the party's support for President Lukashenko, 17 of its members were appointed by him in the country's upper house, the Council of the Republic of Belarus, in 2012.

In 2014, the party increased its representation by obtaining 5 seats.

The party improved its result in the 2016 parliamentary elections, where it won 8 seats and then further increased it in the 2019 elections - where it won 11 seats.

During the 2020–21 Belarusian protests, the Communist Party of Belarus participated in a meeting in support of Alexander Lukashenko.

Electoral history

Presidential elections

Legislative elections

Party leaders

References

External links
 

1996 establishments in Belarus
Communist parties in Belarus
Far-left political parties
International Meeting of Communist and Workers Parties
Neo-Sovietism
Political parties established in 1996
Political parties in Belarus
Eurosceptic parties